Goberta (minor planet designation: 316 Goberta) is a mid-sized Themistian asteroid that was discovered by French astronomer Auguste Charlois on 8 September 1891 in Nice.

References

External links 
 
 

000316
Discoveries by Auguste Charlois
Named minor planets
18910908